Put 'Em Under Pressure is an Irish panel game with a sporting theme hosted by Gráinne Seoige which started on RTÉ One on 18 September 2011. The show's name is taken from "Put 'Em Under Pressure", the official song to the Republic of Ireland national football team's 1990 World Cup campaign.

It involves a team of well-known sports pundits battle against a team of Irish sports stars answering questions on their own and other sports. Each team has a resident captain, each of whom is joined by two guest stars.

Presenters and team members
Gráinne Seoige hosted the show. The team captains were former Kerry Gaelic footballer Pat Spillane and National Hunt champion jockey Ruby Walsh.

Quiz format
The rounds played include:

 Starting Lineup – six numbered squares reveal various sports people, including the names of the four special guests, for contestants to answer a question about.
 Man of the Match – a special guest introduces a piece of footage of one of their major achievements with an alternative commentary. The teams must identify which fact in the commentary is incorrect and why.
 Word of Sport – former Gaelic games commentator Mícheál Ó Muircheartaigh reads an extract from a sporting autobiography or a lyric from a sports-related song. The teams must identify the work in question.
 Five-a-Side – both teams pick a particular topic from a selection of three for the opposing team to answer questions on. Many of the topics have trick names.
 Sprint Finish – this is a ninety-second rapid-fire question round. Each team answers a question with the questions alternating between both teams. If a question is answered incorrectly the contestant is frozen out of the round.

Broadcast details

References

2011 Irish television series debuts
Irish sports television series
RTÉ original programming